Following is a list of senators of Haute-Garonne, people who have represented the department of Haute-Garonne in the Senate of France.

Third Republic

Senators for Haute-Garonne under the French Third Republic were:

 Gabriel Lacoste de Belcastel (1876–1879)
 Joseph Pourcet (1876–1879)
 Jean-François Sacaze (1876–1879)
 Adrien Hébrard (1879–1897)
 Paul de Rémusat (1879–1897)
 Victor Camparan (1879–1906)
 Louis Féral (1886–1889)
 Jean Antoine Ernest Constans (1889–1906)
 Valentin Abeille (1897–1902)
 Camille Ournac (1897–1920)
 Victor Bougues (1902–1907)
 Edmond Caze (1906–1907)
 Raymond Leygues (1906–1920)
 Jean Bepmale (1907–1920)
 Honoré Leygues (1907–1924)
 Jean Cruppi (1920–1924)
 Raymond Blaignan (1920–1933)
 Fabien Duchein de 1920–1933)
 Jean-Marie Saint-Martin (1924–1928)
 Paul Feuga (1924–1933)
 Simon Savignol (1928–1938)
 Eugène Rouart (1933–1936)
 Lucien Saint (1933–1938)
 Bertrand Carrère (1933–1941)
 Jean-Baptiste Amat (1936–1941)
 Eugène Azémar (1938–1940)
 Ernest Beluel (1938–1941)

Fourth Republic

Senators for Haute-Garonne under the French Fourth Republic were:

 Pierre Prévost (1946–1948)
 André Hauriou (1946–1955)
 Pierre Marty (1948–1958)
 André Méric (1948–1959)
 Charles Suran (1955–1959)

Fifth Republic 
Senators for Haute-Garonne under the French Fifth Republic:

References

Sources

 
Lists of members of the Senate (France) by department